Balinder Johal is an Indo-Canadian actress. She is best known for her roles in the films of Deepa Mehta, including Heaven on Earth, for which she was a Leo Award nominee for Best Supporting Actress in 2009, and Beeba Boys, for which she garnered a Canadian Screen Award nomination as Best Supporting Actress at the 4th Canadian Screen Awards in 2016.

Originally from Punjab, Johal was educated in India before moving to Canada to pursue a master's degree in education at the University of British Columbia.

As a stage actress, her most noted performances included Here and Now, a forum theatre play about urban gang violence in Vancouver, and Anosh Irani's play My Granny the Goldfish. She has also performed in guest appearances in the television series The Chris Isaak Show, Da Vinci's Inquest, 49th & Main, Aliens in America, Psych, Smallville and Sanctuary, and minor roles in the films Freddy Got Fingered, Josie and the Pussycats, No Men Beyond This Point and Donkeyhead.

References

External links

Canadian film actresses
Canadian television actresses
Canadian stage actresses
Indian film actresses
Indian television actresses
Indian stage actresses
Indian emigrants to Canada
Actresses from Punjab, India
Actresses from Vancouver
University of British Columbia alumni
Living people
20th-century Canadian actresses
21st-century Canadian actresses
Year of birth missing (living people)
Place of birth missing (living people)